Häxan is a 1922 Swedish-Danish horror film.

Haxan may also refer to:

 Häxan (album), 1922 soundtrack album for the eponymous film
 Haxan Films, film production company based in Orlando, Florida, USA
 The Haxans, a music project founded by Piggy D.
 Häxan (2016 album), album by Swedish rock band Dungen
 Häxan (2010 song), by Trentemøller from the album Into the Great Wide Yonder

See also
 Hexen (disambiguation)